The 1982 Australian Touring Car Championship was a CAMS sanctioned Australian motor racing title open to Group C Touring Cars. It began on 18 February 1982 at Sandown Raceway and ended on 16 May at Oran Park Raceway after eight rounds. The title, which was the 23rd Australian Touring Car Championship, was won by defending champion Dick Johnson, driving a Ford XD Falcon.

Peter Brock had actually scored more points than Johnson throughout the championship driving Marlboro Holden Dealer Team entered Holden Commodore VC and VH SS models. However, the use of not yet homologated engine heads on the cars saw him disqualified from all but two rounds of the championship. The matter between CAMS and the HDT ended in court with Brock agreeing to the loss of points and the championship to avoid a three-month suspension for himself and the team which would have actually excluded them from competing in the James Hardie 1000 at Bathurst.

Allan Moffat's win in Round 5 at Lakeside with a Mazda RX-7 was the first ever ATCC race win by a Mazda and the first ever ATCC race win by a Japanese car. It was also the first ATCC race to be won by a car not powered by a V8 engine since Peter Brock's victory in Round 4 of the 1974 championship at Amaroo Park driving a 6 cylinder, Holden LJ Torana GTR XU-1.

Under 3000cc class competitor Bob Holden finished second in the championship driving a Ford Escort Mk.II. Though he would finish no higher than 8th outright in any race, points scored for class placings saw him finish second on 36 points, 21 behind Johnson and 5 points in front of both Moffat and Kevin Bartlett (Chevrolet Camaro Z28).

Teams and drivers

The following teams and drivers competed in the championship:

Race calendar
The championship was contested over an eight round series. The Sandown round was contested over two parts and all other rounds were contested as single races.

Note: Brock was excluded from Calder and lost all points from Oran Park to Surfers Paradise, however, kept the Symmons Plains win.

Classes 
Cars competed in two engine capacity classes:
 Up to and including 3000cc
 3001 to 6000cc

Note: Mazda RX-7s fitted with bridge port engines competed in the Up to and including 3000cc class and those fitted with peripheral port engines were re-classified into the 3001 to 6000cc class.

Points system
Championship points were awarded on a 9–6–4–3–2–1 basis to the first six placegetters in each class at each round. Bonus points were awarded on a 4–3–2–1 basis to the first four placegetters, irrespective of class, at each round.  Results from seven of the eight rounds could be retained by each driver.

Championship results

Note: Round results indicate outright round placings, not class placings.

References

External links
 Official V8 Supercar site Contains historical ATCC information.
 1982 Australian Touring Car racing images at www.autopics.com.au
 1982 Western Australian race results ex www.terrywalkersplace.com 

Australian Touring Car Championship seasons
Touring Car Championship